Fin and flipper locomotion occurs mostly in aquatic locomotion, and rarely in terrestrial locomotion. From the three common states of matter — gas, liquid and solid, these appendages are adapted for liquids, mostly fresh or saltwater and used in locomotion, steering and balancing of the body. Locomotion is important in order to escape predators, acquire food, find mates and bury for shelter, nest or food. Aquatic locomotion consists of swimming, whereas terrestrial locomotion encompasses walking, 'crutching', jumping, digging as well as covering. Some animals such as sea turtles and mudskippers use these two environments for different purposes, for example using the land for nesting, and the sea to hunt for food.

Aquatic locomotion with fins and flippers

Aquatic locomotion of fish
Fish live in fresh or saltwater habitats and some exceptions are capable of coming on land (mudskippers). Most fish have muscles called myomeres, along each side of the body. To swim, they alternately contract one side and relax the other side in a progression which goes from the head to the tail. In this way, an undulatory locomotion results, first bending the body one way in a wave which travels down the body, and then back the other way, with the contracting and relaxing muscles switching roles. They use their fins to propel themselves through the water in this swimming motion. Actinopterygians, the ray-finned fish show an evolutionary pattern of fine control ability to control the dorsal and ventral lobe of the caudal fin. Through developmental changes, intrinsic caudal muscles were added, which enable fish to exhibit such complex maneuvers such as control during acceleration, braking and backing. Studies have shown that the muscles in the caudal fin, have independent activity patterns from the myotomal musculature. These results show specific kinematic roles for different part of the fish's musculature. A curious example of fish adaption is the ocean sunfish, also known as the Mola mola. These fish have undergone significant developmental changes reducing their spinal cord, giving them a disk like appearance, and investing in two very large fins for propulsion. This adaptation usually gives them the appearance that they are as long as they are tall. They are also amazing fish in that they hold the world record in weight gain from fry to adult (60 million times its weight).

Aquatic locomotion of marine mammals
Swimming mammals, such as whales, dolphins, and seals, use their flippers to move forward through the water column. During swimming sea lions have a thrust phase, which lasts about 60% of the full cycle, and the recovery phase lasts the remaining 40%. A full cycle duration lasts about 0.5 to 1.0 seconds. Changing direction is a very rapid maneuver that is initiated by head movement towards the back of the animal that is followed by a spiral turn with the body. Due to their pectoral flippers being so closely located to their center of gravity, sea lions are capable of displaying astounding maneuverability in the pitch, roll, and yaw direction and are therefore not constrained, turning stochastically as they please. It is hypothesized that the increased level of maneuverability is caused by their complex habitat. Hunting occurs in difficult environments containing rocky inshore/kelp forest communities, with many niches for prey to hide, therefore requiring speed and maneuverability for capture. The complex skills of a sea lion are learned early on in ontogeny and most are perfected by the time the pups reach one year. Whales and dolphins are less maneuverable and more constrained in their movements. However, dolphins are capable of accelerating as fast as sea lions, but they are not capable of turning as quickly and as efficiently. For both whales and dolphins, their center of gravity does not line up with their pectoral flippers in a straight line, causing a much more rigid and stable swimming pattern.

Aquatic locomotion of marine reptiles
Aquatic reptiles such as sea turtles predominantly use their pectoral flippers to propulse through the water and their pelvic flippers for maneuvering. During swimming they move their pectoral flippers in a clapping motion underneath their body and pull them back up into an airplane position, causing forward motion. During the swimming motion it is really important that they rotate their front flipper in order to decrease drag through the water column and increase their efficiency. Sea turtles exhibit a natural suite of behavior skills that help them direct themselves towards the ocean as well as identify the transition from sand to water after hatching. If rotated in the pitch, yaw or roll direction the hatchlings are capable of counteracting the forces acting upon them by correcting with either their pectoral or pelvic flippers and redirecting themselves towards the open ocean.

Terrestrial locomotion

Terrestrial locomotion of fish

Terrestrial locomotion poses new obstacles such as gravity and new media, including sand, mudd, twigs, logs, debris, grass and many more. Fins and flippers are aquatically adapted appendages and typically aren't very useful in such an environment. It could be hypothesized that fish would try to "swim" on land, but studies have shown that some fish evolved to cope with the terrestrial environment. Mudskippers, for example demonstrate a 'crutching' gait which enables them to 'walk' over muddy surfaces as well as dig burrows to hide in. Mudskippers are also able to jump up to 3 cm distances. This behavior is described as starting with a J-curvature of the body at about 2/3 of its body length (with its tail wrapped towards the head), followed by a straightening of their body which propulses them like a projectile through the air. This behavior enables them to cope with the new environment and opens their habitat to new food sources as well as new predators.

Terrestrial locomotion of marine reptiles

Reptiles, such as sea turtles spend most of their lives in the ocean. However, their life cycle requires the females to come on shore and lay their nests on the beach. Consequently, the hatchlings emerge from the sand and have to run toward the water. Depending on their species, sea turtles are described to have either a symmetrical gait (diagonally opposite limbs are moving together) or an asymmetrical gait (Contra-lateral limbs move together). For example, loggerhead sea turtle hatchlings are commonly seen exhibiting symmetrical gait on sand, whereas, leatherback sea turtles employ the asymmetrical gait while on land. Notably, leatherbacks employ their front (pelvic) flippers more during forward terrestrial locomotion. Sea turtles can be seen nesting on subtropical and tropical beaches all around the world and exhibit such behavior such as arribada (Collective animal behavior). This is a phenomenon seen in Kemp's ridley turtles which emerge all at once in one night only onto the beach to lay their nests.

See also
 Animal locomotion
 Kinematics
 Terrestrial locomotion

References

Further reading
 Vogel, Steven (1994) Life in Moving Fluids: The physical biology of flow. 2nd edt. Princeton University Press, Princeton, NJ. 
 McNeill Alexander, Robert. (2003) Principles of Animal Locomotion. Princeton University Press, Princeton, N.J.

External links
 http://www.people.fas.harvard.edu/~glauder/
 https://web.archive.org/web/20040804153413/http://darwin.wcupa.edu/%7Ebiology/fish/
 http://www.cbid.gatech.edu/
 http://seaturtle.org/
 http://www.ap.gatech.edu/Chang/Lab/APPH6232.html
 Research for this Wikipedia entry was conducted as a part of a Locomotion Neuromechanics course (APPH 6232) offered in the School of Applied Physiology at Georgia Tech 

Aquatic locomotion